Dagmar is a Scandinavian given name. It is usually female (but occasionally also male). The name derives from the Old Norse name (Dagmær), dagr meaning "day", and mær meaning "daughter", "mother" and "maiden." Outside of Scandinavia, Dagmar is also used in the Austria, the Czech Republic, Estonia, Germany, the Netherlands, Poland (Dagmara), Slovakia and Switzerland.

Nicknames 
Nicknames of Dagmar are Dagie, Dagmarka, Dasha, Dáša, Digi, and Mara (in Czech); Dagi and Daggi (in German).

Notable people 
 Dagmar (1921–2001), American actress
 Dagmar of Bohemia (1186–1212), Queen Consort of Denmark, wife of King Valdemar II of Denmark
 Maria Feodorovna (Dagmar of Denmark) (1847–1928), Empress Consort of Russia and mother of Emperor Nicholas II
 Princess Dagmar of Denmark (1890–1961), daughter of Frederick VIII of Denmark and his wife, Princess Louise of Sweden and Norway 
Dagmar Berne (1865–1900), Australian medical doctor; first female student to study medicine in Australia
Dagmar Bláhová (born 1949), Czech actress
Dagmar Braun Celeste (born 1941), former First Lady of Ohio
Dagmar Burešová (19 October 1929 – 30 June 2018) Czech lawyer and politician
Dagmar Dahlgren (1880-1951), American singer and motion picture actress
Dagmara Dominczyk (born 1976), Polish American actress
Dagmar Freuchen-Gale (1907–1991), Danish fashion illustrator, author and editor
Dagmar Godowsky (1897–1975), American silent film actress
Dagmar Hagelin (1959–1977), Swedish-Argentinian girl who disappeared during Argentina's dirty war
Dagmar Hase (born 1969), German swimmer
Dagmar Havlová (born 1953), Czech actress and wife of former Czechoslovak President Václav Havel
Dagmar Herzog (born 1961), American scholar of gender and sexuality
Dagmar Holst, rower for East Germany in the 1960s
Dagmar Hülsenberg (born 1940), German materials scientist and university professor
Dagmar Kersten (born 1970), German gymnast
Dagmar Koller (born 1939), Austrian actress and singer
Dagmar Krause (born 1950), German singer
Dagmar Lahlum (1922–1999), Norwegian resistance fighter during World War II
Dagmar Lassander (born 1943), German actress
Dagmar Lerchová (1930–2017), Czechoslovakian figure skater
Dagmar Lurz (born 1959), German figure skater
Dagmar Midcap (born 1969), Canadian media personality
Dagmar Möller (1866-1956), Swedish opera singer and teacher
Dagmar Neubauer (born 1962), German sprinter
Dagmar Nordstrom (1903–1976), American composer, pianist, singer
Dagmar Oakland (1893–1989), American actress
Dagmar Oja (born 1981), Estonian singer and actress
Dagmar Overbye (1883–1929), Danish child murderer and serial killer
Dagmar Rivera (born 1955), known as Dagmar (Puerto Rican entertainer), television host, comedian and singer
Dagmar Roth-Behrendt (born 1953), German politician
Dagmar Salén (1901–1980), Swedish sailor, first Swedish woman to win an Olympic medal in sailing
Dagmar Schipanski (1943–2022), German physicist, academic, and politician
Dagmar Švubová (born 1958), Czechoslovak cross country skier
Dagmar Wilson (1916–2011), anti-nuclear testing activist and illustrator of children's books
Dagmar Wöhrl (born 1954), German politician

Fictional characters 
Dagmar, an engine room worker on a yacht in the 1990 film Joe Versus the Volcano
Dagmar, friend of Maria in Netflix series Lady Dynamite
Queen Dagmar, Bean's mother and first wife of King Zøg in Netflix series Disenchantment

See also
Dagmar (disambiguation)

Feminine given names
Scandinavian feminine given names
Estonian feminine given names
German feminine given names
Swiss feminine given names
Swedish feminine given names
Czech feminine given names
Norwegian feminine given names
Danish feminine given names
Slovak feminine given names
Icelandic feminine given names